Aspidoscelis communis, also known as the Colima giant whiptail, is a species of teiid lizard endemic to Mexico.

References

communis
Reptiles described in 1878
Taxa named by Edward Drinker Cope
Reptiles of Mexico